William Medill (February 1802September 2, 1865) was a Democratic politician from Ohio. He served as the 22nd governor of Ohio from 1853 to 1856.

Biography
Born in White Clay Hundred, New Castle County, Delaware, William was the son of Irish immigrants, William and Isabelle Medill. He grew up on the family farm, in the rural outskirts of Newark. He attended the Newark Academy and graduated in 1825. After graduation, he read law and was admitted to the bar in Delaware in 1830. Medill moved to Ohio in 1830 and was admitted to the bar in Ohio in 1832.

Career
Medill was elected to the Ohio House of Representatives, where he served from 1835 to 1838, serving as speaker of the House from 1836–1837. He was elected to the United States House of Representatives in 1838, serving from 1839 to 1843. He lost a bid for a third term in 1842. After briefly serving as the second assistant postmaster general, Medill was appointed by President Polk as commissioner of Indian Affairs. He returned to Ohio in 1850 to serve as the president of the 1850–1851 Constitutional Convention. Elected to the new post of lieutenant governor of Ohio in 1851, Medill entered office in 1852, serving until the resignation of Governor Reuben Wood on July 13, 1853 to take up a Consular office in Chile. Medill was re-elected in his own right in 1853, but was defeated in a bid for a second full term in 1855 by the anti-slavery Salmon P. Chase. He was First Comptroller of the United States Treasury from 1857 to 1861.

Death
Medill died in Lancaster in 1865, and was interred in Elmwood Cemetery in Lancaster, Ohio. Medill never married. A nephew inherited his property.

Notes

References

External links 
 William Medill entry ar  the National Governors Association
 William Medill entry at The Political Graveyard
 
 
 
 

1802 births
1865 deaths
Comptrollers of the United States Treasury
Democratic Party governors of Ohio
Lieutenant Governors of Ohio
Ohio Constitutional Convention (1850)
Ohio University trustees
People from Lancaster, Ohio
People from New Castle County, Delaware
Speakers of the Ohio House of Representatives
United States Bureau of Indian Affairs personnel
19th-century American politicians
American lawyers admitted to the practice of law by reading law
Democratic Party members of the Ohio House of Representatives
Democratic Party members of the United States House of Representatives from Ohio
19th-century American businesspeople